Muhammad's first revelation was an event described in Islamic tradition as taking place in AD 610, during which the Islamic prophet Muhammad was visited by the angel Jibreel (Gabriel), who revealed to him the beginnings of what would later become the Qur'an. The event took place in a cave called Hira, located on the mountain Jabal an-Nour near Mecca. It is not mentioned anywhere when the exact date and time of the revelation was but according to Mubarakpuri, the exact date of this event was Monday, the 21st of Ramadan just before sunrise, i.e. August 10, 610 C.E. – when Muhammad was 40 lunar years, 6 months and 12 days of age, i.e. 39 solar years, 3 months and 22 days.

Date of the revelation

The state of the calendar at the time of the first revelation

Muhammad was born 55 days after the incident of the elephant, which occurred in the middle of Muharram 570 - i.e. his birth date was Monday, 12 Rabi'I in that year. Many military campaigns occurred around the turn of the year, when conditions were propitious for fighting. Additionally, trade, and gatherings associated therewith, was largely seasonally based. To stop the calendar months from rotating through the seasons, intercalation was employed. This involved the occasional insertion of an extra month (announced at the pilgrimage), ideally seven times in nineteen years. Intercalation was said to have been introduced in AD 412, and it was borrowed from the Jews. The Jewish official controlling the practice was known as Nasīʾ.

When the Arabs adopted the procedure they used this word nasīʾ to denote the whole system. It was operated similarly to the way the Jews operated it - the beginning of the year (Muharram) was tied to the spring season.

Identifying the date of the first revelation

One can establish the day of the Islamic month (but not the month itself) corresponding to a given Julian date by projecting the fixed (i.e. non-intercalated) calendar backwards.   When they do, they will find that 6 August 610 corresponds to 11 Ramadan and 10 August to 15 Ramadan. The first revelation is not looked for earlier than the last ten nights of the month. The equivalence of 40 lunar years, 6 months and 12 days to 39 Gregorian calendar years, 3 months and 22 days is also incorrect. 39 Julian calendar years, 3 months and 22 days takes us back from 10 August 610 to 19 April 571, a Sunday night in Rabi'I according to the fixed calendar proposed as Muhammad's date of birth by scholar Muhammad Sulaiman Al-Mansurpuri and astronomer Mahmud Pasha. This is 14,358 days. Taking the average length of an Islamic month as 29.53059 days, this equates to 486.21 months, which in the fixed calendar is 40 years, 6 months and 6 days. The 6 months and 12 days interval referred to above, on the other hand, is authentic and independent of this calculation. It is unaffected by whether or not the year is intercalated. It is the interval between the date of Muhammad's birth (after sunset on 11 Rabi'I) and the Shia date of first revelation (23 Ramadan). As further proof of its correctness, Muhammad died four days after his birthday, on 14 Rabi'I AH 11 (Monday, 8 June 632).

Converting the Islamic date to Julian

Given the day of the week, the date and the year any Muslim date in the intercalated calendar may be converted to Julian by utilising the known relationship between the intercalated calendar and the seasons. Under intercalation 12 Rabi'I (Muhammad's birth date) might fall in May or June. The exact date is Monday, 2 June 570. Under intercalation 23 Ramadan (the date of first revelation) might fall in November or December. The exact date is the night of Sunday to Monday, 13 to 14 December 610.

Summary

According to biographies of Muhammad, while on retreat in a mountain cave near Mecca (the cave of Hira), where Muhammad used to go and ponder upon the evil deeds of his community. Gabriel appears before him and commands him to "Read!". He responded, "But I cannot read!". Then the angel Gabriel embraced him tightly and then revealed to him the first lines of chapter 96 of the Qur'an, "Read: In the name of Allah Who created, (1) Created man from a clot. (2) Read: And Allah is the Most Generous, (3) Who taught by the pen, (4) Taught man that which he knew not.(5)" (Bukhari 4953).

Before the revelation

Muhammad was born and raised in Mecca. When he was nearly 40, he used to spend many hours alone in prayer and speculating over the aspects of creation. He was concerned with the ignorance of divine guidance (Jahiliyyah), social unrest, injustice, widespread discrimination (particularly against women), fighting among tribes and abuse of tribal authorities prevalent in pre-Islamic Arabia. The moral degeneration of his fellow people, and his own quest for a true religion further lent fuel to this, with the result that he now began to withdraw periodically to a cave named Mount Hira, three miles north of Mecca, for contemplation and reflection. Islamic tradition holds that Muhammad during this period began to have dreams replete with spiritual significance which were fulfilled according to their true import; and this was the commencement of his divine revelation.

The first revelation

According to Muslim tradition, during one such occasion while he was in contemplation, the angel Gabriel appeared before him in the year AD 610 and said, "Read", upon which he replied, "I am unable to read". Thereupon the angel caught hold of him and embraced him heavily. This happened two more times after which the angel commanded Muhammad to recite the following verses:

After the revelation
Perplexed by this new experience, Muhammad made his way to home where he was consoled by his wife Khadijah, who also took him to her Nestorian Christian cousin Waraqah ibn Nawfal. Islamic tradition holds that Waraqah, upon hearing the description, testified to Muhammad's prophethood, and convinced Muhammad that the revelation was from God. Waraqah said: "O my nephew! What did you see?"  When Muhammad told him what had happened to him, Waraqah replied: "This is Namus (meaning Gabriel) that Allah sent to Moses. I wish I were younger. I wish I could live up to the time when your people would turn you out." Muhammad asked: "Will they drive me out?" Waraqah answered in the affirmative and said: "Anyone who came with something similar to what you have brought was treated with hostility; and if I should be alive until that day, then I would support you strongly." A few days later Waraqah died.

The initial revelation was followed by a pause and a second encounter with Gabriel when Muhammad heard a voice from the sky and saw the same angel "sitting between the sky and the earth" and the revelations resumed with the first verses of chapter 74.

At-Tabari and Ibn Hisham reported that Muhammad left the cave of Hira after being surprised by the revelation, but later on, returned to the cave and continued his solitude, though subsequently he returned to Mecca. Tabari and Ibn Ishaq write that Muhammad told Zubayr:

Biographers disagree about the period of time between Muhammad's first and second experiences of revelation. Ibn Ishaq writes that three years elapsed from the time that Muhammad received the first revelation until he started to preach publicly. Bukhari takes chapter 74 as the second revelation however chapter 68 has strong claims to be the second revelation.

References

Life of Muhammad
Gabriel
Angelic apparitions
Revelation